Staškevičius is a Lithuanian-language surname, the Lithuanized version of Polish noble surname Staszkiewicz. Notable people with this surname include: 

Ignas Staškevičius, Lithuanian businessman and author
Gintaras Staškevičius, Lithuanian modern penthatlete
Zofija Staškevičienė, a Lithuanian Righteous Among the Nations

See also
Stankevičius

Lithuanian-language surnames